The State of Nevada Commission on Mineral Resources, also known as the Nevada Division of Minerals, is a Nevada state agency division that focuses on regulating geothermal drilling activities in Nevada, whether conducted in private or public lands. The division is currently headed by a chairman, and the position is currently occupied by Josh Nordquist. It is headquartered in Carson City and maintains an additional office in Las Vegas.

History 
The commission and division have been in existence since 1977, though the commission was originally called the Nevada Oil and Gas Conservation Commission. The division, however, was already known as the Division of Mineral Resource and functions as part of the Nevada State Department of Conservation and Natural Resources. In 1983, however, the commission was replaced by the Oil, Gas, and Mining Board and remained this way until 1993, when the commission was replaced by the Commission on Mineral Resources. As it has been since 1977, the commission contains seven members, though the structure has changed over time.

Programs 
The Division of Minerals focuses on operating the following programs:

 Abandoned Mine Lands (AML)
 Bond Pool (Reclamation)
 Dissolved Mineral Resource Exploration (DRME)
 Education & Outreach
 Geothermal
 Mining
 Oil & Gas

See also 

 Mining in the United States
 Gold mining in Nevada
 Silver mining in Nevada
 United States Department of Energy

References

External link 
Official website
State agencies of Nevada